This is a list of the 32 federal entities (31 states and Mexico City) of Mexico by poverty rate in 2012.

Methodology 
This list includes both moderate poverty and extreme poverty rates. Percentages appear very high as a result.

Mexican states

See also
 Poverty in Mexico

General:
 States of Mexico
 Geography of Mexico
 List of Mexican states by area
 List of Mexican states by population
 List of Mexican states by population growth rate
 List of Mexican states by fertility rate
 Ranked list of Mexican states

References

Poverty rate
Mexico, poverty rate